Harry J. Wienbergen (October 21, 1900 – March 6, 1974) was an American football coach.  Wienbergen was the third head football coach at Dickinson State College—now known as Dickinson State University—in Dickinson, North Dakota and he held that position for 21 seasons between 1928 and 1952.  His coaching record at Dickinson State was 51–70–13.  Wienbergen died aged 73 in 1974.

References

External links
 

1900 births
1974 deaths
Dickinson State Blue Hawks football coaches
People from Platteville, Wisconsin